Naomi Sakashita (born 25 May 1975) is a retired Japanese runner who specialized in the 5000 metres and marathon.

On the track she won the 5000 metres at the 1994 Asian Junior Championships, won the bronze medal in half marathon at the 1997 East Asian Games, and won the silver medal in the 5000 metres at the 2000 Asian Championships.

At the 1995 World Cross Country Championships she finished 31st in the senior race and ended fourth in the team competition. She finished sixteenth at the 1995 World Half Marathon Championships; sixth in the team competition. She won a bronze medal at the 1996 World Road Relay Championships.

Her personal best times were 15:28.99 minutes in the 5000 metres, achieved in May 2000 in Nobeoka; 32:53.40 minutes in the 10,000 metres, achieved in May 1996 in Mito; 1:10:17 hours in the half marathon, achieved in August 1997 in Shibetsu; and 2:28:09 hours in the marathon, achieved in March 2001 in Nagoya.

References

1975 births
Living people
Japanese female long-distance runners
Japanese female marathon runners
20th-century Japanese women
21st-century Japanese women